Ivan Lendl and Bill Scanlon were the defending champions, but did not participate this year.

Darren Cahill and Mark Kratzmann won the title, defeating Carl Limberger and Mark Woodforde 4–6, 6–2, 7–5 in the final.

Seeds

  Peter Doohan /  Laurie Warder (semifinals)
  Darren Cahill /  Mark Kratzmann (champions)
  John Fitzgerald /  Wally Masur (semifinals)
  Carl Limberger /  Mark Woodforde (final)

Draw

Draw

References
Draw

Doubles